Georgy Ivanovich Chevychalov (born 17 December 1935) is a Soviet hurdler. He competed in the men's 400 metres hurdles at the 1960 Summer Olympics.

References

External links
 

1935 births
Living people
Athletes (track and field) at the 1960 Summer Olympics
Soviet male hurdlers
Olympic athletes of the Soviet Union
Place of birth missing (living people)
Universiade medalists in athletics (track and field)
Universiade silver medalists for the Soviet Union